The women's +78 kg competition of the judo events at the 2019 Pan American Games in Lima, Peru, was held on August 11 at the Polideportivo 3.

Results 
All times are local (UTC−5)

Bracket

Repechage round
Two bronze medals were awarded.

References

External links
(with results)

W79
2019
Pan American W79